was a Japanese painter.

Biography
In 1918, Ōkōchi studied watercolor under Sanchi Itakura and printmaking under Kishio Koizumi as well as other methods under Okada Saburōsuke. He contributed to the magazine  in 1922.  He graduated from the Meiji University Department of Economics in 1928 and studied at Hongō Painting Institute under Manjirō Terauchi in 1930.  Ōkōchi participated in the 1931 Nihon Hanga Kyōkai exhibition.

In 1933, Ōkōchi's painting, won the fourteenth Emperor Exhibition prize from the Imperial Art Academy.  By 1937, he was researching art from Europe.  Ōkōchi became a member of Kōfūkai in 1940.  He and Kanemon Asai as well as others formed Shinjukai in 1947.

Personal life
Ōkōchi was the second son of Viscount Masatoshi Ōkōchi, the director of Riken, and the daughter of Ōkōchi Nobuhisa.  Chieko was his wife.  His daughter with her was actress Momoko Kōchi.

Ancestry

References

External links

1903 births
1967 deaths
20th-century Japanese painters
Meiji University alumni
Ōkōchi clan
Artists from Tokyo